The list of Olympic men's ice hockey players for South Korea consists of 22 skaters and 3 goaltenders. Men's ice hockey tournaments have been staged at the Olympic Games since 1920 (it was introduced at the 1920 Summer Olympics, and was permanently added to the Winter Olympic Games in 1924). South Korea participated for the first time at the 2018 Winter Olympics, which it hosted.

Key

Goaltenders

Skaters

See also
 South Korea men's national ice hockey team

Notes

References

 
 
 
 

ice hockey
South Korea
South Korea

South Korea men's national ice hockey team